The Eckhörner Peaks are a series of about six peaks that form the north wall of Schussel Cirque, in the north-central Humboldt Mountains of Queen Maud Land. They were discovered and given the descriptive name "Eck-Hörner" (corner peaks) by the Third German Antarctic Expedition, 1938–39, under Alfred Ritscher.

References 

Mountains of Queen Maud Land
Humboldt Mountains (Antarctica)